4265 Kani is a dark background asteroid from the inner regions of the asteroid belt. It was discovered by Japanese astronomers Yoshikane Mizuno and Toshimasa Furuta at Kani Observatory  on 8 October 1989. It was named for the Japanese city of Kani.

Orbit and classification 

Kani  is a non-family asteroid of the main belt's background population when applying the hierarchical clustering method to its proper orbital elements. It orbits the Sun in the inner main-belt at a distance of 1.9–2.9 AU once every 3 years and 9 months (1,382 days). Its orbit has an eccentricity of 0.20 and an inclination of 4° with respect to the ecliptic. The body's first observation at Crimea-Simeis dates back to 1917, while the first used observation was made at Turku in 1940, extending the asteroid's observation arc by 49 years prior to its discovery.

Naming 

This minor planet was named for the Japanese city of Kani, home of the discoverer, located in the countryside of Japan's Gifu Prefecture, approximately 30 kilometers north of Nagoya, the country's third largest city. Kani is situated on the Kiso riverside, which is referred to as the Japan Rhine because of its similarities to the Rhine in Europe. The official naming citation was published by the Minor Planet Center on 11 March 1990.

Physical characteristics 

In the Bus–Binzel SMASS classification, Kani is characterized as a common, carbonaceous C-type asteroid.

Rotation period 

In October 2008, two rotational lightcurves of this asteroid were obtained from photometric observations made at the Golden Hill Observatory in Stourton Caundle and the Palmer Divide Observatory in Colorado Springs, Colorado. The lightcurves gave an identical rotation period of  hours and a brightness variation of 0.75 ± 0.02 in magnitude. Observations at the Palomar Transient Factory and revised shape-models have since confirmed the body's rotation period.

Diameter and albedo 

According to the space-based surveys carried out by the Japanese Akari satellite and the NEOWISE mission of NASA's Wide-field Infrared Survey Explorer, the asteroid measures 15.7 and 14.2 kilometers in diameter, respectively. Conversely, the Collaborative Asteroid Lightcurve Link calculates a diameter of only 7.5 kilometers, due to an assumed albedo of 0.20, which is untypically high for a carbonaceous asteroid.

Notes

References

External links 
 Lightcurve plot of 4265 Kani, Palmer Divide Observatory, B. D. Warner (2008)
 Lightcurve Database Query (LCDB), at www.minorplanet.info
 Dictionary of Minor Planet Names, Google books
 Asteroids and comets rotation curves, CdR – Geneva Observatory, Raoul Behrend
 Discovery Circumstances: Numbered Minor Planets (1)-(5000) – Minor Planet Center
 
 

004265
Discoveries by Yoshikane Mizuno
Discoveries by Toshimasa Furuta
Named minor planets
004265
19891008